The 2011 William Hill Grand Slam of Darts, was the fifth staging of the darts tournament organised by the Professional Darts Corporation. The event took place from 12–20 November 2011 at the Wolverhampton Civic Hall, Wolverhampton, England.

For the first time, Sky Sports was given the television coverage of the Grand Slam after taking over from ITV Sport as the event's broadcaster.

Scott Waites was the defending champion, but he was eliminated in the group stages. The title was won for the fourth time by Phil Taylor, who defeated Gary Anderson 16–4 in the final.

Prize money

Qualifying
There were numerous tournaments that provided qualifying opportunities to players. Most tournaments offered a qualifying position for the winner and runner-up of the tournament, however the World Championships and the Grand Slams offered a place in the tournament to all semi-finalists. There were also various other ways of qualifying for overseas players, including those from Europe and the United States, as well as a wildcard qualifying event open to any darts player. The qualifying criteria were changed this year, extending the dates back 5 years for respective World Champions to receive an invite.

Qualifying tournaments

PDC

BDO

Other qualifiers

Pools

Draw and results

Group stages
all matches first-to-5/best of 9.

NB in Brackets: Number = Seeds; BDO = BDO Darts player; RQ = Ranking qualifier; Q = Qualifier
NB: P = Played; W = Won; L = Lost; LF = Legs for; LA = Legs against; +/- = Plus/minus record, in relation to legs; Average – 3-dart average; Pts = Points

Group A

12 November 

13 November 

15 November

Group B

12 November

13 November

15 November

Group C

12 November

13 November

15 November

Group D

12 November

13 November

15 November

Group E

13 November

14 November

16 November

Group F

13 November

14 November

16 November

Group G

13 November

14 November

16 November

Group H

13 November

14 November

16 November

Knockout stages

Statistics

References

External links
PDC.tv Netzone, with results and news

2011
Grand Slam
Grand Slam of Darts
Grand Slam of Darts